The Pride of the Southland Band is the official name of the University of Tennessee's marching band.

History
The Pride of the Southland Marching Band has been performing at halftime for more than 110 years, but has existed since 1869 when it was founded as part of the Military Department, forerunner to the school's ROTC program. It is one of the oldest collegiate band programs in the country.  Its instrumentation in 1883 was entirely made up of cornets.  The band continued to grow to between thirteen and seventeen members, and in 1892, it was reorganized under Ernest H. Garratt. 
The band wore West Point-style uniforms like the rest of the cadets in the Military Department and had a more varied repertoire of instruments, including a clarinet.

At the turn of the twentieth century, William A. Knabe was appointed as band director.  He was the first “full-time” band director; Garratt had also served as an organist, choirmaster, musical director, and director of the Glee Club.  UT won the first (documented) game at which the band performed in 1902.

By 1917, the band had changed to World War I style uniforms and doubled in size.  The band grew along with the military units on campus. By 1935, the band boasted eighty-five members, but remained all male due to the band’s continued association with the Military Department. In 1937, an all-female contingent called the "Volettes" began performing with the band. Its membership ranged from fifty to ninety.

The 1940s brought women into the band. Two of the first women to play with the band were Martha Carroll, who played the lyre, and Marjorie Abbott, a marimba player.  By 1946, women outnumbered the male members of the band, due to World War II and the death of male students. By 1949, the band was once again all male, but retained female majorettes.  Major Walter Ryba was properties master for the Army and Air Force ROTC at Knoxville and also for the Army ROTC at the UT-Martin campus.

The name "Pride of the Southland" was a group decision of the band members themselves, on the morning of October 15, 1949, as they stood around on the sidelines at Legion Field in Birmingham, Alabama awaiting a chance to practice for the afternoon game. They were waiting for Alabama's Million Dollar Band, under the direction of "Colonel" Butler, to finish its practice. That afternoon as the band came out on the field and paused for introduction, for the first time "Presenting The University of Tennessee's Pride of the Southland Band under the direction of 'Major' Walter M. Ryba" was heard over the loudspeakers by the 44,000 fans present and listeners on the radio. It was generally felt that Ryba did not know ahead of time that he was receiving a "commission".

In 1961, Tennessee native W J Julian (1922-2015) was hired as an associate professor and director of the UT bands. Under Julian's leadership the band grew in size, prestige, and reputation. The band was then removed from the ROTC department and placed under the Music Education Department. Julian designed the band’s black, orange, white, and creme-colored uniforms, which paid homage to the band’s military past and are still in use to this day. Some of the many traditions established under Julian's direction are: the band's signature "Big Orange Sound"; its pregame formations; forming the T for the team to run through; Rocky Top; and Circle Drills, a geometric and kaleidoscopic drill concept from which many drills were derived through his and his immediate successors' tenures.

Although Julian retired in 1993, the band still upholds the tradition of excellence he set. Besides representing the State of Tennessee in 13 presidential inaugurations, the band has appeared at the many bowl games the Vol football team has traveled to throughout the nation. Additionally, due to Julian's influence, the Pride is one of only two SEC bands with a strutting Big Ten-style drum major.

In March 2007, The Pride traveled to Dublin, Ireland, to play at various concerts and in the St. Patrick's Day Parade.

Director of Bands Gary Sousa was removed from his post October 14, 2013, and placed on administrative leave by the university after a public confrontation with the UT Athletic Department.  Donald Ryder was then appointed interim Director of Bands, and Michael Stewart was appointed interim Associate Director.  On January 29, 2015 it was announced that Ryder would permanently serve as Director of Bands and W J Julian Professor of Music, and Stewart would permanently serve as Associate Director of Bands.  On March 7, 2022, it was announced that Michael Stewart would assume the Director of Bands.   He will begin in this role July 1, 2022.

Traditions

Personnel and field presence
The UT Marching Band is an entirely mobile unit; its halftime complement usually includes around 200 wind instruments (necessitated by the optimal number of people to create the geometry of circle drills); a line of non-pitched and indefinite pitched percussion (pitched percussion instruments like bells and xylophones are never utilized, nor is sideline or "pit" percussion); 24 or 32 color guard; 10 majorettes; and one drum major.  The UT band customarily enters the field live, playing music from the initial step-off from the sideline; it also exits the field live, most often to the music of the "Tennessee Waltz March."

Pregame

The Pride's pregame show was designed by Julian with musical arrangements by Warren Clark and Barry McDonald.  This six minute and forty-five second show has remained largely unchanged since the 1960s. It begins with the drumline starting off a cadence as the band marches onto the field. Then, part of the "Tennessee Waltz March," a march version of the "Tennessee Waltz" in common time, is played as the band forms a block formation. The band then plays the National Anthem in this formation. Then the full version of the "Tennessee Waltz March" followed by, starting in the 2007 season, a march version of Alabama's "Tennessee River", then the "Alma Mater March". As they march back playing the "Alma Mater March," they spell out VOLS. Then the visiting team's fight song is played in the direction of the opposing team's band and student section. After this, the band forms the traditional interlocking "U" and "T" and marches this across the majority of the field accompanied by "Rocky Top". Then the "Power T" is formed while "Spirit of the Hill" is played. Once the "Power T" is formed, all the Vols fans are asked to join in the Volunteer Wave and the crowd spells out "V-O-L-S" and chant "Go Vols Go!" Then the Pride of the Southland's Drum Major runs through the middle of this formation. The band then marches across the field until it reaches the opposite end zone. At this point, "Stars and Stripes Forever" is played and the band forms a large "USA" to the visiting sideline, then inverts the form to face the front sideline. The band then plays "Fight Vols Fight" as they form the giant T formation which then opens up as the football team runs through while "Down the Field" is played. The band then turns and marches off the field to "Fight Vols Fight" while keeping the T formation.

Although the T formation is used almost exclusively at UT home games in Neyland Stadium, it has been done at other venues, most notably at the 1986 and 1991 Sugar Bowl.

Halftime

Rocky Top

Julian introduced "Rocky Top" in a halftime show in 1972, after which it made its way to the stands. The song has become so closely identified with the Vols that many believe it to be the school's official fight song.  Indeed, an early version of the SEC's Web site included a recording of "Rocky Top" as Tennessee's fight song.  However, Tennessee's official fight song is "Down the Field."

"Rocky Top" was written by Felice and Boudleaux Bryant in 1967 and recorded by the Osborne Brothers that same year.

Spirit of the Hill
The oldest tradition of the Pride of the Southland comes at the end of every home halftime show where the Pride plays Spirit of the Hill and forms an interlocking UT with the year 1794 or, more recently, on one side of the field a U and on the other side a T, on the field from 2010 to 2015. The year 1794 returned in 2016. This is the longest lasting tradition of the band dating back more than one hundred years.

Alma Mater

After forming the interlocking UT at the end of every home halftime show, the Pride plays the Alma Mater. UT's Alma Mater was officially adopted in 1928 after a yearlong contest sponsored by the school's musical organizations. A Chattanoogan, Mary Fleming Meek, won the $50 prize with her song entitled "On a Hallowed Hill." Although Mrs. Meek was not an alumna of UT, both her husband, John Lamar Meek, and her son were graduates, and her father was a former trustee of the university.  Another tradition of the Pride is to interlock arms and sing the Alma Mater prior to marching to the stadium for every home football game.

Salute to the Hill

At every home game, the Pride performs the "March to the Stadium", which includes a parade sequence and climaxes when the Band stops at the bottom of "The Hill" (the oldest section of campus which resides upon the tallest hill right next to Neyland Stadium) and performs the "Salute to The Hill", a homage to the history and legacy of the University. The parade begins an hour and forty minutes before kickoff. You can watch the Salute to "The Hill" on YouTube.

Presidential inaugurations

With the exception of 2013, Pride of the Southland has represented the state of Tennessee for all Presidential Inaugurations since 1953, the most of any non-military band.

150th Anniversary
The 2019 football season marked the 150th anniversary of the Pride of the Southland Band. Custom drum heads with the logo shown were placed in the bass drums for all 2019 shows, and a gala was held on Homecoming weekend at the Knoxville Convention Center for alumni and family, with special appearances by Lee Greenwood and the 2019 Pride of the Southland Marching Band.

.

External links

References 

Southeastern Conference marching bands
University of Tennessee
Musical groups from Tennessee
Musical groups established in 1869
Articles containing video clips
1869 establishments in Tennessee
College marching bands in the United States